Akrotiri Lighthouse is a 19th-century lighthouse on the Greek island of Santorini. The lighthouse was built by a French company in 1892, making the lighthouse one of the oldest in Greece. The lighthouse ceased operating during World War II. The Greek Navy recommissioned the lighthouse in 1945. The lighthouse is famed for its sunset views.

References

External links 
 

Buildings and structures in Santorini
Lighthouses in Greece
Lighthouses completed in 1892